Carmichaelia astonii (common name Aston's dwarf broom)  is a species of pea in the family Fabaceae. It is found only in South Island of New Zealand. Its conservation status (2018) is "Nationally vulnerable" under the New Zealand Threat Classification System.

Taxonomy & naming
The species was first described by George Simpson in 1945, who gave it the specific epithet, astonii, to honour Bernard Aston. A lectotype, AK 70629 collected by Simpson in February 1937 on the Ure River, in the Marlborough Region, is held in the Auckland Museum.

References

External links
Carmichaelia astonii occurrence data from Australasian Virtual Herbarium

astonii
Flora of New Zealand
Taxa named by George Simpson
Plants described in 1945
Endangered flora of New Zealand